Wrecking Everything – An Evening in Asbury Park is a 2002 live DVD by thrash metal band Overkill. It was recorded at The Paramount, Asbury Park, New Jersey on March 23, 2002. This is the very first Overkill DVD/VHS and the video counterpart to their Wrecking Everything live album.

Track listing

Disc 1: An Evening in Asbury Park – Live 
"Necroshine" 
"Thunderhead" 
"Evil Never Dies" 
"Deny the Cross" 
"Wrecking Crew" 
"Powersurge" 
"Gasoline Dream" 
"I Hate" 
"Coma" 
"Shred" 
"Hello from the Gutter" 
"Bleed Me" 
"Long Time Dyin" 
"It Lives" 
"Battle" 
"Spiritual Void" 
"The Years of Decay" 
"In Union We Stand" 
"Overkill" 
"Horrorscope" 
"Rotten to the Core" 
"Elimination" 
"Fuck You/War Pigs"

Disc 2: Special Features 
Batmen: The Return (Chaly Speaks Documentary) – 85 min.
Behind the Scenes – 5 min.
Photo Gallery

Credits
Bobby "Blitz" Ellsworth – lead vocals
D.D. Verni – bass, backing vocals
Dave Linsk – lead guitar, backing vocals
Derek Tailer – rhythm guitar, backing vocals
Tim Mallare – drums

Production
 Produced by Overkill

External links
 Official OVERKILL Site
 [ Allmusic Guide]

Overkill (band) video albums
2002 live albums
2002 video albums
Live video albums
Asbury Park, New Jersey
Spitfire Records live albums